King's Highway 102, commonly referred to as Highway 102, formerly as Highway 11A and Highway 17A and historically as the Dawson Road, is a provincially maintained highway in the Canadian province of Ontario, serving as a northern bypass to the city of Thunder Bay for all vehicle traffic. Both the western and eastern termini of Highway 102 are with the concurrency of Highway 11 and Highway 17; in the rural community of Sistonens Corners to the west and in Thunder Bay to the east. The majority of Highway102 is surrounded by thick forests and swamps. However, owing to its historic nature, it is lined with residences outside of urban Thunder Bay.

Although the road Highway102 now follows dates to the 1850s, it did not become a provincial highway until 1937, when it was designated as Highway17A. Between 1960 and 1971, following the extension of Highway11 to Rainy River, it was also designated as Highway11A. By 1972, the route had been renumbered as Highway102.

Route description 

Highway102 passes through terrain typical of northern Ontario highways, including thick boreal forest and muskeg. On a  eastward journey, the surroundings quickly change from isolated muskeg-ridden foothills to urban development as the highway enters Thunder Bay from the north. Highway102 provides a shortcut over the Trans-Canada Highway to the south.

Highway102 begins at Sistonens Corners, immediately south of a Canadian National Railway (CN) overpass, along Highway11 and Highway17. A truck stop sits to the west of the intersection. From there, the two-lane road travels east through rolling hills, with muskeg dotting the valleys between the hills. The highway meets Silver Falls Road, which proceeds north to Silver Falls Provincial Park. The terrain becomes gentler as the route passes several houses while travelling alongside a creek. The highway curves as it meets a power transmission line, which it then parallels. It zig-zags southeast, passing alongside Mud Lake and briefly curving back to the east. Curving back to the southeast, the highway serves several houses before crossing into Thunder Bay at Townline Road and curving to the east.

Within the city limits, the density of residences surrounding the highway rapidly increases as the terrain flattens. The highway intersects Mapleward Road, then diverges from the power transmission lines and curves southeast into suburban Thunder Bay. It meets Secondary Highway 589 after passing the Emerald Greens Golf Course. The route then travels through North McIntyre, formerly a separate community which was annexed. It descends through a wide muskeg, after which it is crossed by several power transmission lines. The highway enters urban Thunder Bay immediately thereafter, where it passes to the west of County Fair Mall before ending at an intersection with the Thunder Bay Expressway. The road which carries Highway102 continues through Thunder Bay as Red River Road, and was once part of the highway.

History 

Highway102 was designated by the beginning of 1972, following the route of the former Highway11A and Highway17A. Prior to that, the Dawson Road generally followed the present route of the highway.

The history of the Dawson Road began in 1857 when Henry Hind and Simon Dawson were commissioned to survey the territorial claims of the Hudson's Bay Company, as well as to survey a route between Lake Superior and the Red River. A second set of surveys were carried out by Captain John Palliser that same year. The latter recommended avoiding the Kaministiquia River, but ultimately Hind and Dawson's route was chosen. By 1868, the route was blazed between Shebandowan and what would soon be named Prince Arthur's Landing (later changed to Port Arthur). In 1870, the Wolseley Expedition set out from Toronto to end the Red River Rebellion. When Colonel Garnet Wolseley arrived at the present site of Winnipeg, the rebels had fled. However, the expedition resulted in the construction of a road along Dawson's route.
It was further improved in 1871.

In 1935, the Department of Northern Development (DND) began construction on a northern bypass of Port Arthur, mostly following the Dawson Road. This road was designated Highway17A on April1, 1937, when the DND merged into the Department of Highways.
In 1959, Highway 120 was renumbered as Highway11, and a  concurrency with Highway17 between Shabaqua Corners and Nipigon was created to join the discontinuous segments. As the northern bypass of Port Arthur now formed an alternate route to both Highway11 and 17, it was codesignated as Highway11A and 17A.

Between January 1971 and 1972, Highway11A and Highway17A were redesignated as Highway 102.
Work began shortly thereafter to realign several sections of the highway with dangerous curves and steep grades approaching the Kaministiquia River; the highway opened in 1975, featuring a new bridge over the river.

Major intersections

References 
Sources

Bibliography

External links 

Ontario Ministry of Transportation: Northern Ontario Road Maps

102
Roads in Thunder Bay
Roads in Thunder Bay District